is a train station located in Kurume, Fukuoka.

Lines 
Nishi-Nippon Railroad
Tenjin Ōmuta Line

Platforms

Adjacent stations

Surrounding area
 Kurume Tsubukuhonmachi Post Office
 Tsubuku Community Center
 Tsubuku Elementary School
 Kyushu Electric Industry
 Kimuraya Kurume Factory
 Tsubuku Housing Complex
 Tsubukuhonmachi Bus Stop (Nishitetsu Bus)

Railway stations in Fukuoka Prefecture
Railway stations in Japan opened in 1921